() is one of the districts of Xiamen, People's Republic of China.  It is located on the mainland, and is Xiamen's easternmost district.

Geography

Dadeng Subdistrict of Xiang'an District is made up of offshore islands and islets including:
Dadeng (Tateng)
Xiaodeng
Jiaoyu
Baihajiao
Dadeng (大嶝/大嶝島), Xiaodeng (小嶝/小嶝島) and Jiaoyu (角嶼) were part of Kinmen County in Republican China and are claimed by modern Kinmen County, Republic of China (Taiwan). The islands have been under PRC control since October 9 or October 15, 1949.

Administrative divisions
Xiang'an District administers one subdistrict, four towns and one other area:
 Dadeng Subdistrict (大嶝街道, formerly 大嶝镇)
 Xindian
 Xinxu
 Maxiang
 Neicuo
 Damaoshan Farm

The district was created out of five towns of Tong'an District in October 19, 2003. Since then Dadeng Town has been renamed Dadeng Subdistrict and made the district seat.

Transport
The Xiamen Xiang'an Tunnel is located in the district. It starts from Wutong of Xiamen Island and terminates at Xibin, Xiang'an District, Xiamen. It was completed in November 2009 and was at the time the first tunnel of its kind on the mainland.

Healthcare
The Healthcare industry started rapidly adopting AI technology applications in 2017 and at the beginning of 2018 the People's Government of Xiang’an Xiamen announced plans to build China's first healthcare industry centre in Xiamen. To achieve this it partnered with leading technology firms Deloitte and the Cogobuy Group.

Cogobuy Group's subsidiary IngDan had over 1,000 healthcare innovation projects at the time with many planned for integration into the new healthcare centre.  The integration plan involved the projects gradually being introduced into the city's new healthcare centre and focused on promoting healthcare projects, establishing healthcare industry investment funds, as well as the build out of a new healthcare medical data platform.

Education

Xiang'an district is the location of the new campus of Xiamen University.

It is predicted to accommodate up to 30,000 students. The campus has an automobile-free policy; most journeys by students and faculty are made on bicycles.

References

External links

Xiamen government website

County-level divisions of Fujian
Geography of Xiamen